Lapidaria may refer to:

 Lapidaria (plant), a genus of succulent plant in the family Aizoaceae
 Lapidaria (trilobite), a genus of extinct trilobites
 Lapidaria (vicus), an Ancient Roman vicus in the province of Raetia (now Switzerland)

See also 
 Lapidarium, a collection of stone monuments of archaeological interest